Mohammed Anas (born 19 December 1994) is a Ghanaian professional footballer who plays for Jordanian side Al-Wehdat as a striker.

Career
Born in Accra, Anas has played for Maritzburg United, Free State Stars, Polokwane City, Black Leopards and TS Galaxy. In March 2017, a post-match interview with Anas went viral after he thanked both his wife and his girlfriend. He later stated that his 'girlfriend' was referring to his daughter.

In November 2021, he was released by TS Galaxy after teammates complained that be was bringing "bad luck" to the team.

He signed for Al-Wehdat for the 2022 season.

He scored his first goal for Al-Wehdat in a 5-2 loss against Al Sadd in the 2022 AFC Champions League.

Honours 
Free State Stars
 Nedbank Cup: 2017–18

References

1994 births
Living people
Ghanaian footballers
Maritzburg United F.C. players
Free State Stars F.C. players
Polokwane City F.C. players
Black Leopards F.C. players
TS Galaxy F.C. players
South African Premier Division players
Association football forwards
Ghanaian expatriate footballers
Ghanaian expatriate sportspeople in South Africa
Expatriate soccer players in South Africa
Ghanaian expatriate sportspeople in the United Arab Emirates
Al-Wehdat SC players
UAE Pro League players